The DePaul Blue Demons are the athletic teams that represent  DePaul University, located in Chicago, Illinois. The Blue Demons participate in NCAA Division I and are a member of the Big East Conference.

DePaul's Athletic Director is DeWayne Peevy. DePaul was not affiliated with any conference until it helped establish the Great Midwest Conference in 1991. It subsequently became a charter member of Conference USA from 1995 until its move to the original Big East in 2005 through 2012. DePaul and the other six Catholic, non-FBS schools announced on December 15, 2012, their separation to eventually form a new conference that would carry the Big East name in 2013.

Nickname
The origin of the Blue Demons nickname dates back to 1907 when the university changed its name from St. Vincent's College to its current form. At the time, the athletic teams had red uniforms with a large "D" on the front. After an announcer referred to the players as the "D-men," the moniker stuck and eventually evolved into "Demons." The "blue" was part of an attempt to distinguish the university's players from those of its now-defunct high school, DePaul Academy. The former wore red with a blue "D," while the latter adopted the reverse. The official athletic colors are scarlet and royal blue.

Sports sponsored
A member of the Big East Conference, DePaul University sponsors teams in six men's and seven women's NCAA sanctioned sports.

Men's basketball

DePaul's NCAA men's basketball team is well known for its basketball program, which gained prominence under Ray Meyer who led DePaul to two NCAA Division I basketball Final Four's in the 
1942–43 season and 1978–79 season. Meyer also led the Blue Demons to the 1945 NIT championship during the 1944–45 season. 
The current head basketball coach is Tony Stubblefield, having taken the position in 2021.

The team currently plays their home games at Wintrust Arena adjacent to the McCormick Place convention center.

Women's basketball

DePaul's NCAA women's basketball team has reached the Sweet 16 multiple times in the program's history. Head Coach Doug Bruno has been the women's basketball coach since 1988.

The team currently plays their home games at Wintrust Arena adjacent to the McCormick Place convention center and select games at McGrath-Phillips Arena.

Men's soccer

The DePaul Blue Demons men's soccer team represents DePaul University in the Big East Conference in Division I of the National Collegiate Athletic Association (NCAA).

Softball
Since 2011, the head coach of Wisconsin's softball program is former Blue Demon second-baseman Yvette Healy.  Former DePaul All-American pitcher Tracie Adix-Zins returned to Lincoln Park to lead the softball program as head coach just before the start of the 2019 season. Following her standout career in the circle for the Blue Demons she has served as an assistant coach at Wisconsin, Oklahoma State and North Carolina State.

Women's volleyball
The DePaul Blue Demons women's volleyball team competes in NCAA Division I volleyball and is part of the Big East Conference.

Former varsity sports

Football
DePaul University fielded a varsity football team until 1939. It played its home games at Wrigley Field and Soldier Field.

Club sports
DePaul offers a number of other intercollegiate club athletic teams under its Department of Campus Recreation.

Football
DePaul fielded a football club team in the National Club Football Association until 2015.

Men's Ice Hockey
DePaul University has an ice hockey club team called the DePaul University Hockey Club that competes in the Northern Collegiate Hockey League in the Central Region of the ACHA. The team plays a 25–30 game schedule against regional opponents. Home games are played at Johnny's Ice House West. In 2009 the team made the ACHA Division II National Championship Tournament for the first time in the team's history.

Men's Lacrosse
DePaul University fields Men's Lacrosse at the non-varsity club level in the Great Lakes Lacrosse League in the Chicago Division. DePaul Men's Lacrosse divisional rivals include: Bradley University, University of Chicago, Lake Forest College, Loyola University Chicago, Northern Illinois University, Northwestern University, Western Illinois University and Wheaton College, as well as other GLLL opponents. The Men's Lacrosse Club play their home games at Diversey Harbor (Chicago Park District) and Montrose Beach (Chicago Park District).

DePaul reached the national stage in 2013 when they reached their first ever MCLA Tournament appearance only to be ousted in the 1st round by the 2012 and 2013 MCLA Division II Champion, St. Thomas Tommies 11–3.

Conference Championships
 2013: 9–3 (3–1)

National Tournament Appearances
 2013: 1st Round

Men's Roller Hockey
DePaul's roller hockey club competes in the Midwest Collegiate Roller Hockey League, a league within the NCRHA.  The team was first started in 2005 and played steadily in the NCRHA for seven consecutive seasons before dropping out of the league for a few years.  The team has recently been reactivated and rejoined the NCRHA in 2014.  The current team plays in Division III of the MCRHL.

Rowing
DePaul has had a crew team for the last four years and gained formal recognition in 2013.

Men's Rugby
DePaul University currently competes as a non-varsity club in USA Rugby's DII collegiate rugby division. As one of the top collegiate teams in the city of Chicago, DePaul competes in the Great Midwest Rugby  Conference formerly known as the WIIL Conference in the Southern division. As famed collegiate rugby writer Alex Goff states,
WIIL conference is one of the toughest divisions in DII rugby." DePaul Rugby was the inaugural champion of the THG Chicago Cup. Men's Rugby play their home matches at Diversey Harbor (Chicago Park District).

Tennis
DePaul University Club Tennis competes regionally in the Midwest League of the USTA's national Tennis on Campus program. They practice and host their home matches at Midtown Athletic Club Chicago, the largest indoor tennis facility in the country. In recent years, the club has taken a lead role in helping to develop the Chicago Tennis on Campus community of schools. In February 2013, they were named USTA Midwest Club of the Year.

Men's volleyball
DePaul University's Men's Volleyball Club competes at the division 1AA level, hosts and travels to several tournaments per year, competing against clubs from across the nation. The Blue Demons practice and play their home matches at the Ray Meyer Fitness and Recreation Center. In 2011, the Blue Demons finished 3rd at the NCVF National Championships in Houston, TX, their best finish in club history.

Water Polo
DePaul Water Polo is a coed water polo club that was founded in 2013. Practices are currently held at Gill Park in the Lakeview neighborhood of Chicago.

Athletic facilities

Current facilities
Wintrust Arena: the 10,000-seat arena is the home of the Blue Demons men's and women's basketball teams.
 Lakeshore Sport and Fitness: Home of the men's and women's tennis teams. 
 Lane Stadium: Home stadium for the men's and women's track and field teams. 
 McGrath-Phillips Arena: a 3,000-seat indoor arena located in the Sullivan Athletic Center is the home of women's volleyball team since the facility opened in 2000.
 Ruffled Feathers Golf Club: Home golf course for the men's and women's golf teams.
 Wish Field/Cacciatore Stadium: Wish Field, which features a FieldTurf playing surface, is home of the Blue Demons men's and women's soccer teams in autumn. Cacciatore Stadium occupies the south end of Wish Field for Blue Demons softball in spring, with its 1,200-seat grandstand situated in the southwest corner.

Former facilities
Allstate Arena — Men's basketball
Alumni Hall — Men's and women's basketball, Women's volleyball
Soldier Field — Football
University Auditorium — Men's basketball
Wrigley Field — Football

Traditions

Mascot
DePaul's mascot is DIBS which stands for Demon In a Blue Suit. DIBS is present at every Blue Demons basketball game and makes frequent appearances at DePaul's Lincoln Park Campus and charity appearances around the Chicago metropolitan area. While the Blue Demon nickname has been around for many years, the Blue Demon mascot took the game floor for the first time in 1968 with a papier-mache head and old warm-up suit. Through the years, the Blue Demon has taken on many forms in its evolution and was dubbed DIBS in 1999.  Former mascot performers; John Maniatis and Paul Fisher.

References

External links